Alinco ( Alinco Inc.) is a Japanese manufacturer of radio and amplification equipment, and in the Japanese market, metal products, construction equipment, and exercise equipment.

Corporate affairs 
Established in 1938 in Osaka, Japan, it also has offices in Tokyo, Takatsuki, manufacturing facilities in Toyama and Hyōgo in Japan, and one in Suzhou, China.

See also

References

External links
 Alinco Amateur Amateur and Commercial radio division
 Alinco rigs Complete list of Alinco radios
 Alinco Japan Official site
 Alinco USA Distributor Amateur/Commercial

Amateur radio companies
Electronics companies of Japan
Manufacturing companies based in Osaka
Electronics companies established in 1938
Companies listed on the Tokyo Stock Exchange
Japanese brands
Japanese companies established in 1938